{{Infobox officeholder
| honorific_prefix = The Honourable
| name = Pearl Calahasen
| honorific-suffix = 
| image =20130902-Pearl Calahasen.jpg
| birth_date =
| birth_place =Grouard, Alberta
| residence = 
| office = Member of the Legislative Assembly of Alberta for Lesser Slave Lake
| term_start = March 20, 1989
| term_end =May 5, 2015
| predecessor = Larry Shaben
| successor =Danielle Larivee
| office1 = Alberta Minister of Aboriginal Affairs and Northern Development
| term_start1 = March 15, 2001
| term_end1 = December 15, 2006
| predecessor1 = Ministry Established| successor1 = Guy Boutilier
| note1 = Boutilier held the combined portfolio of International, Intergovernmental, and Aboriginal Relations
| office2 = Alberta Associate Minister of Aboriginal Affairs
| term_start2 = May 26, 1999
| term_end2 = March 15, 2001
| predecessor2 =
| successor2 = '''Ministry Abolished
| office3 = Alberta Minister without Portfolio in charge of Children's Services
| term_start3 = May 31, 1996
| term_end3 = May 26, 1999
| predecessor3 =
| successor3 = Iris Evans
| party = Progressive Conservative
| alma_mater = University of AlbertaUniversity of Oregon
| religion =
| occupation =
}}Pearl Calahasen'  (born December 5, 1952) is a Canadian politician, who represented the electoral district of Lesser Slave Lake in the Legislative Assembly of Alberta from 1989 to 2015. A member of the Progressive Conservative party and former cabinet minister (holding the positions of Minister without Portfolio in charge of Children's Services, Associate Minister of Aboriginal Affairs, and Minister of Aboriginal Affairs and Northern Development).

Calahasen was the first Métis woman elected to public office in Alberta, and, after the 2012 Alberta election, she was Alberta's longest currently-serving MLA.

Early life

Calahasen was born in 1952 and raised in Grouard, Alberta.  She attended the University of Alberta, from which she received a Bachelor of Education, and the University of Oregon, from which she received a master's degree.

Political career

Electoral record

Calahasen first sought election in the 1989 Alberta election, when she ran as the Progressive Conservative candidates in the riding of Lesser Slave Lake.  She won a plurality of votes, capturing 47.6% and defeating her nearest rival, Liberal Denise Wahlstrom, by nearly one thousand votes.  This was the closest election of her political career to date; in subsequent elections, she won shares of the votes ranging from 55.5% (in the 1993 election) to 74.2% (in the 2001 election).

At the time of her election in 1989, Calahasen was the first Métis woman elected to public office in Alberta.

Cabinet roles

Calahasen served as a backbencher in Ralph Klein's government until 1996, when Klein appointed her Minister without Portfolio responsible for Children's Services.  She served in this capacity until 1999, when she was shuffled to the position of Associate Minister of Aboriginal Affairs. In 2001 she was promoted to full minister, of Aboriginal Affairs and Northern Development.  Calahasen initially supported Lyle Oberg in the 2006 P.C. leadership election, but switched her endorsement to Ed Stelmach after Oberg dropped off the ballot; despite this support, she was not included in Stelmach's cabinet once he became premier in 2006.

Legislative initiatives

Calahasen has sponsored a number of bills over her career in the legislature.

As a backbencher

Despite not being a member of cabinet, in 1990, Calahasen sponsored the Metis Settlements Act, a government bill which incorporated Métis settlements as a new class of municipality.  It passed with the support of the opposition, although New Democrat Bob Hawkesworth expressed concern that the settlements were not given sufficient autonomy from government.  The same year, she sponsored the Nechi Community College Act, a private bill that would have established the Nechi Community College but did not reach second reading.

In 1995, Calahasen sponsored the Colin Chor Wee Chew Legal Articles Act, another private bill which didn't progress to second reading.  She also sponsored the Public Health Amendment Act, designed to allow nurse practitioners to fulfill some of the functions of doctors in communities in which doctors were in short supply. The bill passed with the support of the opposition Liberals, but some members, including Terry Kirkland, Colleen Soetaert, Percy Wickman, Gary Dickson, Lance White, and Howard Sapers, argued that the bill left out too many details and left the details in the realm of legislation, inappropriately empowering bureaucrats at the expense of the legislature.

As a minister

As Associate Minister of Aboriginal Affairs, Calahasen sponsored the First Nations Sacred Ceremonial Objects Repatriation Act'', a 2000 government bill that allowed for the repatriation of first nations artifacts.  It passed with full opposition support.

Election results

1989 general election

|}

1993 general election

|}

1997 general election

|}

2001 general election

|}

2004 general election

|}

2008 general election

|}

2012 general election

2015 general election

References

External links
 Legislative Assembly of Alberta biography of Pearl Calahasen

Progressive Conservative Association of Alberta MLAs
Women MLAs in Alberta
Living people
University of Alberta alumni
Academic staff of the University of Alberta
University of Oregon alumni
People from Big Lakes County
Métis politicians
Canadian educators
Canadian Métis people
Women government ministers of Canada
1952 births
Members of the Executive Council of Alberta
First Nations women in politics
Indspire Awards
20th-century Canadian legislators
20th-century Canadian women politicians
21st-century Canadian legislators
21st-century Canadian women politicians
First Nations academics